Haifa Center HaShmona railway station (Taḥanat HaRakevet Ḥeifa Merkaz HaShmona) is an Israel Railways passenger station situated on the coastal railway main line and serves the City of Haifa.

Location
The station is situated on the North-South coastal line and is located on Plumer Square (Kikar Plumer) along Independence Road (Derekh HaAtzma'ut) in Haifa's downtown (or Lower-Town). The station is one of three railway stations serving the city of Haifa directly and also one of six railway stations within Haifa's municipal borders. However, despite ostensibly being the city's central station, it is significantly less busy than Hof HaCarmel station on the city's southwestern outskirts.

History

Haifa Center railway station was built by the British during their Mandate for Palestine and was opened in 1937. The station was built on territory reclaimed from the Mediterranean Sea during the construction of Haifa Port in the 1930s. The station building was built in the Bauhaus style and was aligned with the buildings that stood on HaAtzmaut Road (then  Kingsway), thus it is not parallel to the rail tracks and platforms at the station.

At first the station was constructed with two side platforms, but over time a third rail track was added along the far-side platform, thus making it an island platform.

Several years later a second story was added to the station building to increase its office capacity (this was possible because the building was designed to have up to four stories).

During the 1950s and 1960s Plumer Square housed one of Haifa's Central Bus Stations, until it was relocated to Haifa Bat Galim Central Bus Station in the 1970s. The adjacent Haifa Bat Galim Train Station, which was built and opened concurrently, replaced Haifa Central as Haifa's de facto central train station (a title it, too, would lose to Hof HaCarmel station in the early 2000s, simultaneously with the replacement of the Bat Galim bus station with the Hof HaCarmel Central Bus Station).

Until 1980 the head office of Israel Railways was located at Haifa Central Station. Tzvi Tzafriry, the general manager of Israel Railways, decided to move the head office to Tel Aviv Savidor Station.

In the years 2003-2004 the station underwent extensive upgrading and renovation. The station has been made accessible for the disabled. The low bridge connecting the two platforms was replaced by a tunnel with elevators (the bridge was too low for the planned overhead electrical lines). During the upgrade both the interior and exterior of the station were renovated and updated to the present passenger station standard of Israel Railways.

During the 2006 Israel-Lebanon conflict train service to the station was suspended after a Hezbollah Katyusha rocket hit a nearby train depot on July 16, 2006, killing eight Israel Railways workers. It was restored 29 days later, on August 14, two days after the ceasefire went into effect.

On July 16, 2007, one year after the incident, the station was renamed "Haifa Merkaz Hashemona" (Haifa Center of the Eight) to commemorate the eight victims.

On December 16, 2021, National Infrastructure Plan 65-Bet was approved. Under this plan, the station would be relocated underground and renamed Haifa Government District, while an expanded Hof HaCarmel would become Haifa's official central train station.

Train service

Haifa Center is a station on both the main North-South coastal line of Israel Railways (which serves parts of the Nahariya–Haifa–Tel Aviv–Ben-Gurion Airport–Modi'in, the Nahariya–Haifa–Tel Aviv–Lod–Beersheba, and in the future the Haifa–Tel Aviv–Jerusalem Intercity Lines) and the suburban line serving Haifa's northern suburbs–The Qrayot, Akko (Acre), and Nahariya (Haifa–Akko/Nahariya Suburban Service). It also serves trains operating on the Jezreel Valley railway. The station is situated between Merkazit HaMifratz railway station to the north and Haifa Bat-Galim railway station to the south. Train service at the station is very frequent. For example, on weekdays during peak times (7:00-11:00 and 15:00-20:00) there are four trains per hour to and from Tel Aviv Central with a journey time of about one hour.

Inter-City Service:
On weekdays the station is served by 61 southbound and 62 northbound trains 24 hours a day, with additional trains offered on peak travel days (Sundays and Thursdays).
On Fridays and holiday eves the station is served by 21 southbound and 21 northbound trains. The last train departs at 15:59 and the last train arrives at 17:48.
On Saturdays and holidays the station is served by 6 southbound and 5 northbound trains. The first train arrives at 22:23 and the first train departs 21:03.
Suburban Service:
On weekdays the station is served by 32 southbound and 35 northbound suburban trains traveling from Haifa to Akko or Nahariya.

Station layout
Platform numbers increase in an East-to-West direction

Ridership

Public transport connections

Haifa Center Railway Station is located next to HaAtzmaut Road, a major public transport artery, thus easily accessible from both bus and Sherut Taxi (share taxi).
Bus lines include:
Metronit line 1: Haifa Hof HaCarmel Central Bus Station–Krayot Central Bus Station via Down-Town and Mifratz Central Bus Station.
Metronit line 2: Bat Galim Railway Station–Kiryat Ata via Down-Town and Mifratz Central Bus Station.
14: Bat Galim neighborhood (Circular) (Operated on Saturdays only).
17: Carmel Beach CBS–Technion.
18: Bat Galim railway station–Neve Sha'anan neighborhood.
19/19א: Bat Galim neighborhood–Technion (Evenings and nights only).
36: Bat Galim railway station–University
200: Haifa Bay CBS - Dado Beach (Nights only).
205: Haifa Central railway station–Tirat Carmel (Weekend nights only).
236: Haifa Central railway station–Central Carmel.
331 and 332: Suburban lines to Nazareth.

The station is also within a short walking distance from the Port of Haifa's passenger terminal and is near Kikar Pariz (Paris Square) – a Carmelit (Haifa's subway) station.

Facilities
Payphone
Ticket cashier
Ticket machine
Buffet
Parking lot
Toilet
Taxi station

References

External links

Israel Railways website

Center HaShmona railway station
Railway stations opened in 1937